Ray Hutchins (born 23 March 1929) is a former Australian rules footballer who played with Melbourne in the Victorian Football League (VFL).

Notes

External links 		

		
		
		

1929 births
Living people	
Australian rules footballers from Victoria (Australia)		
Melbourne Football Club players